Douglas Jay Band (born October 28, 1972)  is an American businessman and lawyer. He is a founding partner and former president of Teneo, a multinational C-suite advisory firm and investment bank. Previously he was Deputy Assistant to President Bill Clinton in the White House and later counselor to President Bill Clinton. Band was the "key architect" of the Clinton post-presidency and he created the Clinton Global Initiative (CGI). Band later worked for the William J. Clinton Foundation, and Band also traveled to North Korea to orchestrate the release of two Americans and to Cuba to help secure the release of American Alan Gross.

Additionally, he served as a member of Coca-Cola's International Advisory Committee and since 2010  has served as an associate adjunct professor at New York University, teaching a class on public service.

Early life and education
Band is the youngest of four children of David and Myrna Band. A native of Sarasota, Florida, Band earned a bachelor's degree from the University of Florida with a major in English and a minor in Ethics. He was a member of  Sigma Phi Epsilon fraternity.  While working in the White House for six years, he earned a master's degree in liberal arts from Georgetown University's graduate school and a Juris Doctor degree from Georgetown University Law Center, attending both programs in the evening while working full time in the White House.

Career

Service in the Clinton Presidency
Band began working in the White House in 1995 during the Clinton Presidency as an unpaid intern in the White House Counsel's Office.  Band then served on the White House Counsel's office staff for four years, eventually becoming a special assistant to the president, and then one of the youngest deputy assistants ever to serve a president. Band then served as the President's aide, traveling to nearly 125 countries and over 2,000 cities.

Post-presidential career
Band served as counselor and chief advisor to former President Clinton until 2012. He was "the key architect of Clinton's post-presidency." During Clinton's post-presidency, Band helped setup and advised President Clinton's personal office and the Clinton Global Initiative and advised the William J. Clinton Foundation in its formative years. He created and built the Clinton Global Initiative. According to figures released by the Clinton Foundation, CGI raised $69 billion for 2,100 philanthropic projects around the world. Clinton has credited Band with CGI: "Doug had the idea to do this," also stating that he was "very grateful for the role that [Band] played when we started out."

Band negotiated with the Obama Administration to appoint then-Senator Hillary Clinton to become Secretary of State. Band also traveled with former President Clinton to North Korea to orchestrate the release of American journalists Laura Ling and Euna Lee from captivity on August 4, 2009.

According to emails from 2009 and 2011 published by Wikileaks Band wrote a memo accusing Bill Clinton, Chelsea Clinton, and her husband Marc Mezvinsky of conflicts of interest, with the latter raising money for his hedge fund from Clinton foundation donors and friends. In 2011, Chelsea Clinton accused Band of having conflicts of interest between his work at the Clinton Foundation and Teneo Consulting. According to Politico, the dispute eventually "degenerated" into a "dust-up" between Doug Band and Chelsea Clinton. Band resigned from working for the Clintons in 2012. 
 
Band served on the Coca-Cola Company International Advisory Board and on the Vote Vets advisory board. He is on the Georgetown University Board of Regents and the board of Boys and Girls Club, and is a trustee at the Oklahoma City National Memorial & Museum, and on the boards of New York City Football Club, Students First, and the University of Florida Foundation. Band was a member of the Board of Directors for the USA Bid Committee in its failed effort to bring the FIFA World Cup to the United States in 2018 or 2022, through US Soccer. Since 2010 Band has taught a class on The Intersection of Politics and Public Service at New York University Wagner as an adjunct associate professor. Band retired from Teneo in December 2020.

Band appeared multiple times on the Jeffrey Epstein flight logs in the early 2000s along with former President Bill Clinton and members of the secret service.

Personal life
Band and his wife Lily Rafii live in New York City and have three children. Bill Clinton gave a toast at Band's wedding.

References

External links
Doug Band at Teneo
Doug Band Official Website

1972 births
Living people
Walsh School of Foreign Service alumni
University of Florida College of Liberal Arts and Sciences alumni
Clinton administration personnel
Assistants to the President of the United States
Georgetown University Law Center alumni
People from Sarasota, Florida